Big Red Riding Hood is a 2013 Taiwanese idol romantic-comedy television series. Produced by Sanlih E-Television and Dreamland Productions, it stars Cheryl Yang as the female main lead and Yao Yuan Hao as the male lead. The series first aired on February 28, 2013 on TTV after Love Me or Leave Me series.

Plot
Wu Zhang Mei (Cheryl Yang) is a woman who grew up with a strong sense of justice. One day, her childhood friend and classmate An De Feng (Yao Yuan Hao) returns to their hometown after leaving suddenly when they were young. As An De Feng has come back with revenge in mind because of a misunderstanding, both meet up again to clear things up and patch their friendship.

Cast
The cast of Big Red Riding Hood includes the following:

Main cast
Cheryl Yang as Wu Zhang Mei
 Yao Yuan Hao as An De Feng
 Tender Huang as Lei Yu Luo / Lei Yu Xuan
 Li Chen Xiang as Bryant
 Adriene Lin as Lin Ya Ting

Minor cast

Casting

Cheryl Yang had to play a shy woman for the series. She last acted in 2012 series Once Upon a Love with Sunny Wang and Matt Wu.

Broadcast

Soundtrack

The Big Red Riding Hood OST EP CD was released on May 24, 2013 by various artists under Forward Music Taiwan. It contains four songs. The opening theme song, "Fantasy Paradise" by A-fu was not included in the OST, while the ending theme song, "Me&U" by A-fu was the first track of the EP.

Track listing

Insert Songs
The following lists the songs that were inserted into the drama, but not included in the original soundtrack. It includes the opening song "Fantasy Paradise" by A-fu.

Episode ratings
The viewers' survey was conducted by AGB Nielsen.

Notes

References

External links
Big Red Riding Hood on TTV
Big Red Riding Hood on SETTV
Big Red Riding Hood  on EBC
Big Red Riding Hood on TVB

Eastern Television original programming
Sanlih E-Television original programming
2013 Taiwanese television series debuts
2013 Taiwanese television series endings
Taiwanese romantic comedy television series